Keith Rowley (1919–1982) was an Australian racing cyclist.

Career highlights

1947
1st Australian national road race title 
1st and Blue Riband in the Melbourne to Warrnambool Classic 
1948
2nd and 2nd fastest Tour of Gippsland 
1949
2nd Australian long distance title of 187 miles
1950
1st Australian national road race title 
2nd in Stage 1 part b Tour of the West, Dubbo 
1st in Stage 5 part a Tour of the West, Penrith
2nd in Stage 5 part b Tour of the West, Sydney 
3rd in General Classification Tour of the West 
1951 
8th in General Classification Tour of the West 
1952 
1st in General Classification Herald Sun Tour 
3rd in Stage 5 'Sun' Tour of Victoria Maffra, Victoria 
1st in General Classification 'Sun' Tour of Victoria

Australian professional cycling career

Rowley also won the Blue Riband for the fastest time in the Melbourne to Warrnambool in 1947.

Keith's brother Max Rowley was also a successful cyclist, winning the Blue Riband for the fastest time in the Warrnambool in 1950 and 3rd in the Australian national road race in 1948 and 1952. Max and Keith finished 1st and fastest and 2nd and 2nd fastest respectively in the 1948 Tour of Gippsland.

References

External links
 

1919 births
1982 deaths
Australian male cyclists